John Edwin Smith (May 27, 1921 - December 7, 2009) was an American philosopher and Clark Professor of Philosophy at Yale University. He served as president of the American Philosophical Society, Eastern Division, the American Theological Society, the Metaphysical Society of America, the Hegel Society of America and the C.S. Peirce Society.

References

20th-century American philosophers
Philosophy academics
1921 births
2009 deaths
Presidents of the Metaphysical Society of America
Yale University faculty
Philosophers from New York (state)
People from Brooklyn
Columbia University alumni
Culinary Institute of America people